The Progress Atlas Championship is a professional wrestling championship created and promoted by the British professional wrestling promotion Progress Wrestling. Initially, the title was destinated exclusively for wrestlers weighing over 205 pounds (the cruiserweight weight limit) in weight, but the respective rule was scrapped in time.

Title history
On 27 February 2019, Progress announced that there would be a unification match between the Atlas and World championships at Super Strong Style 16 on 5 May of that year, with Walter winning and thus unifying the two titles. On 21 July 2019, Progress announced that the Atlas Championship had been retired, to be replaced with the upcoming Proteus Championship. Luke Jacobs is the current champion in his first reign. He defeated Jonah in a tournament final to reactivated title at Chapter 133: Stop Motion Skeleton Battle on 18 April 2022, in Camden Town, London. Rampage Brown was the first champion after winning a tournament. 

There have been a total of eleven reigns shared between eight different official champions. The current champion is Ricky Knight Jr. who is in his first reign.

Reigns

Combined reigns 

References

External links 
 Progress Atlas Title History at Cagematch.net

Progress Wrestling championships